2014 Vasilevskis, provisional designation , is a stony Phocaean asteroid from the inner regions of the asteroid belt, approximately  in diameter. It was discovered on 2 May 1973, by American astronomer Arnold Klemola at the U.S. Lick Observatory on Mount Hamilton, California. It was named after Stanislavs Vasilevskis, staff member at the discovering observatory.

Orbit and classification 

Vasilevskis is a member of the Phocaea family, a group of asteroids with similar orbital characteristics, named after the family's namesake, 25 Phocaea. It orbits the Sun in the inner main-belt at a distance of 1.7–3.1 AU once every 3 years and 9 months (1,360 days). Its orbit has an eccentricity of 0.29 and an inclination of 21° with respect to the ecliptic. No precoveries were taken prior to its discovery.

Physical characteristics 

Vasilevskis has been characterized as a common S-type asteroid.

Rotation period 

In May 2014, a photometric lightcurve analysis by American astronomer Robert Stephens at the Center for Solar System Studies, California, gave a rotation period of  hours with a brightness variation of 0.26 in magnitude.

Alternative measurements also made in 2014, include an observation by astronomer René Roy, which rendered a period of  hours with an amplitude of 0.31 in magnitude, and an analysis at the Burleith Observatory, with a period of  hours, or 49% of the first period.

Diameter and albedo 

According to the space-based surveys carried out by the Japanese Akari satellite and the NEOWISE mission of NASA's Wide-field Infrared Survey Explorer, the asteroid measures between 9.1 and 11.8 kilometers in diameter, and its surface has an albedo between 0.265 and 0.451. The Collaborative Asteroid Lightcurve Link assumes an albedo 0.23 – derived from 25 Phocaea, the family's largest member and namesake – and calculates a diameter of 9.6 kilometers with an absolute magnitude of 12.3.

Naming 

This minor planet was named after astronomer Stanislavs Vasilevskis (died 1988), long-time staff member at the discovering Lick Observatory from 1949 to 1974.

A specialist for astrometric instrumentation, in particular the computational analysis of the position of astronomical objects from photographic plates, he has also performed broad astronomical surveys to obtain the parallax and proper motion of stars. The official  was published by the Minor Planet Center on 30 June 1977.

References

External links 
 Asteroid Lightcurve Database (LCDB), query form (info )
 Dictionary of Minor Planet Names, Google books
 Asteroids and comets rotation curves, CdR – Observatoire de Genève, Raoul Behrend
 Discovery Circumstances: Numbered Minor Planets (1)-(5000) – Minor Planet Center
 
 

 

002014
Discoveries by Arnold Klemola
Named minor planets
19730502